Spirit Radio Network was a commercial radio network covering regional Western Australia. It was part of the Redwave Media Group owned by Seven West Media and broadcast to most towns and regional centers in Western Australia including Bunbury, Geraldton, Broome, Port Hedland and Karratha.The Spirit Radio Network targeted 30 to 54 year-old listeners with a Hot AC format and operates under the Australian radio callsigns 6KA, 6NW, 6SAT, 6BAY and 6EL.

History
Spirit Radio Network was first launched as The Star Radio Network in 2000s, however stations 6NW Port Hedland and 6KA Karratha first began broadcasting in the 1970s under the North West Radio branding. The network was later rebranded as The Spirit, later Spirit Radio Network.

In October 2019, Spirit Radio was included in the sale of Redwave Media to Southern Cross Austereo.. On 16 March 2020, Spirit Radio programming was replaced with that of Triple M, with local advertising feeds retained for Broome, Geraldton, Karratha, Port Hedland and remote Western Australia.

In May 2020, Crocmedia purchased Spirit Radio Bunbury 621 AM.  On 24 August 2020, Spirit Radio was rebranded as SEN Spirit, with the local advertising feed retained for Bunbury.

Frequencies

Unlike rival Southern Cross Austereo stations, Spirit Radio Network programming was predominantly based in WA. Local Spirit stations receive twice daily local news bulletins. Statewide weather forecasts are provided on the hour. In the cyclone season, Spirit broadcasts warning updates.

References

External links

Adult contemporary radio stations in Australia
Australian radio networks
Radio stations disestablished in 2020
Radio stations in Western Australia
Seven Network
2020 disestablishments in Australia